The Penghu Tianhou Temple is a temple dedicated to the sea goddess Mazu located on Zhengyi Street in Magong City, Penghu, Taiwan. It is usually considered the oldest Mazu temple in Taiwan and, despite differences in characters, is the namesake of the surrounding city of Magong. It is open from 7:00am to 5:30pm daily.

Name
The original name of the site was the Niangma Temple ("Temple of the Honorable Mother)". It was renamed the Tianfei Temple ("Temple of the Princess of Heaven") following its rebuilding in the 16th century. The present Chinese name of the temple followed Mazu's elevation by the Qing and translates as the "Palace of the Queen of Heaven" and is sometimes romanized as the  Its English name is also sometimes transcribed as the

History

The temple claims to be the oldest in Taiwan, possibly dating to the early Ming in the 15th century. It was supposedly destroyed by "Japanese" pirates and rebuilt in the 16th century. It was enlarged following Yu Dayou's 1563 victory over the pirates at Putian and again after another imperial victory in 1592, a date sometimes given as its foundation. Alternatively, its construction is credited to the Hoklo in 1593 or 1604. A 1604 stele recording the ultimatum Yu Dayou's son Zigao gave to the Dutch to abandon Taiwan was discovered at the temple in 1919. In 1622, the Dutch seized the area and erected a fort; following their conquest by Yu Zigao's forces two years later, the temple was again remodeled.

Magong grew up around the temple and was named for it. Under Japanese rule, the port of Magong was a major base of the Imperial Japanese Navy. Its characters were changed in 1920 but it retained the same pronunciation in Japanese and English as before. In Mandarin, however, the names no longer match, since the tone of the first syllable shifted from first to third. The present temple is largely the result of a 1922 renovation, mostly employing Tangshan, Guangzhou, and Chaozhou artists.

Architecture
The temple complex consists of a front, main, and back temple with an extra row of houses ("guarding dragons") on either side. It is built on the slope of the hill, with the temples rising from front to back. The front temple is also known as the Shanchuan Temple. The temple has a high and sweeping "swallowtail" roof.

Artwork
The temple is filled with wood carvings in the Chaozhou style. The name plaque on the front temple is surrounded by three dragons. The swastikas on the main hall's door panels are taken to represent eternal prosperity; wealth and happiness are also symbolized by the doors' flowers and birds. The columns have lion and paired rabbit bases.

Legacy
The temple is one of the landmarks of Taiwan turned into moe figures in artist Chih Yu's We Stay, We Live.

Gallery

See also
 Qianliyan & Shunfeng'er
 List of Mazu temples around the world
 List of temples in Taiwan
 Lan Mu

References

External links
 , including cutaways of the temple and main hall.
 

Mazu temples in Penghu
National monuments of Taiwan